Steelmaking